Abies sibirica, the Siberian fir, is a coniferous evergreen tree native to the taiga east of the Volga River and south of 67°40' North latitude in Siberia through Turkestan, northeast Xinjiang, Mongolia and Heilongjiang.

Distribution

The tree lives in the cold boreal climate on moist soils in mountains or river basins at elevations of 1900–2400 m. It is very shade-tolerant, frost-resistant, and hardy, surviving temperatures down to −50 °C. It rarely lives over 200 years due to the susceptibility to fungal decay in the wood.

Description
Siberian fir, Abies sibirica, grows 30–35 m tall with a trunk diameter of 0.5–1 m at breast height and a conical crown.  The bark is grey-green to grey-brown and smooth with resin blisters typical of most firs.  Shoots are yellow-grey, resinous, and slightly pubescent.  The leaves are needle-like, 2–3 cm long and 1.5 mm broad on average.  They are light green above with two grey-white stomatal bands underneath, and are directed upwards along the stem.  They are soft, flattened, and strongly aromatic.  The cones are cylindrical, 5–9.5 cm long and 2.5–3.5 cm broad, with small bracts hidden by the scales.  They ripen from bluish to brown or dark brown in mid-autumn.  The seeds, 7 mm long with a triangular wing 0.7–1.3 cm long, are released when the cone disintegrates after maturity.

Varieties
There are two varieties:
Abies sibirica var. sibirica.  Described above.
Abies sibirica var. semenovii (B. Fedtschenko) Farjon.  Endemic in Kyrgyzstan.  Branchlets noticeably ridged and grooved.  Resin canals marginal.  Cones yellow-brown, with broader bracts than those of var. sibirica.

Ecology
Abies sibirica is subject to infection from the fungus Delphinella balsameae which was reported from Russia for the first time in 2003.

Uses
Essential oils extracted from the leaves are used in aromatherapy and perfumes.  The wood is soft, lightweight, and weak.  It is used in construction, furniture, and wood pulp.

References

External links
Gymnosperm Database - Abies sibirica
Flora of China: Abies sibirica
Plants For A Future - Abies sibirica

sibirica
Trees of Siberia
Flora of Xinjiang
Flora of Kyrgyzstan
Trees of Mongolia
Trees of Asia
Trees of China
Flora of Central Asia
Trees of continental subarctic climate
Least concern plants
Trees of Europe